The critical community size (CCS) is the minimum size of a closed population within which a human-to-human, non-zoonotic pathogen can persist indefinitely.

When the size of the closed population falls below the critical community size level, the low density of infected hosts causes extinction of the pathogen. This epidemiologic phenomenon was first identified during measles outbreaks in the 1950s.

The critical community size depends on:
 Speed of transmission
 How long until a person who has recovered remains immune
 Fatality rate
 Birth and death rate in the general population

See also

References

External links 
 The Collection of Biostatistics Research Archive
 'Epidemiology' – In: Philip S. Brachman, Medical Microbiology (fourth edition), US National Center for Biotechnology Information
 Monash Virtual Laboratory - Simulations of epidemic spread across a landscape
 People's Epidemiology Library

Infectious diseases
Epidemiology